For information on all University of Louisiana at Monroe sports, see Louisiana–Monroe Warhawks

The Louisiana–Monroe Warhawks Women's Soccer Team is an intercollegiate varsity team representing the University of Louisiana at Monroe. The Louisiana–Monroe Warhawks competes in Division I of the National Collegiate Athletics Association (NCAA) and in the Sun Belt Conference. Home matches are played at Brown Stadium on the ULM campus. The current head coach is Sean Fraser, who was named the head coach of the Warhawks on January 14, 2020. The Warhawks played their first season in 1999.

Coaches

Seasons

 Note: Louisiana–Monroe was in the Southland Conference in soccer from 1999 to 2005; Sun Belt Conference from 2006–present

References

External links
 Official site
 Media guide

 
NCAA Division I women's soccer teams